Freeman is an unincorporated community in the center of Clay Township, Owen County, in the U.S. state of Indiana. It lies near the intersection of County Road 650 South and Indiana Highway 43, which is a community nearly nine miles south of the city of Spencer, the county seat.  Its elevation is 541 feet (165 m), and it is located at  (39.1953233 -86.7336153).

History
A post office was established at Freeman in 1866, and remained in operation until it was discontinued in 1915. The community was named after a family of settlers.

Geography
 Raccoon Creek flows through this community.
 Brown Cemetery is about two miles south of this community, and it is located on State Ferry Road  (39.1714346 -86.7280593).
 Livingston Cemetery is about a mile northeast this community, and it is located on County Road 225 East (aka Bittersweet Road)  (39.1983788 -86.7211149).

School districts
 Spencer-Owen Community Schools, which includes a high school.

Political districts
 State House District 46
 State Senate District 39

References

External links
  Roadside Thoughts for Freeman, Indiana

Unincorporated communities in Owen County, Indiana
Unincorporated communities in Indiana